Austria competed at the 1998 Winter Olympics in Nagano, Japan.

Medalists

Alpine skiing

Men

Men's combined

Women

Women's combined

Biathlon

Men

Men's 4 × 7.5 km relay

 1 A penalty loop of 150 metres had to be skied per missed target.
 2 One minute added per missed target.

Bobsleigh

Cross-country skiing

Men

 1 Starting delay based on 10 km results. 
 C = Classical style, F = Freestyle

Men's 4 × 10 km relay

Women

 2 Starting delay based on 5 km results. 
 C = Classical style, F = Freestyle

Figure skating

Women

Freestyle skiing

Men

Women

Ice hockey

Men's tournament

Preliminary round - group A
Top team (shaded) advanced to the first round.

Consolation Round - 13th place match

Leading scorers

Team Roster
Claus Dalpiaz
Reinhard Divis
Dominic Lavoie
Andreas Pusnik
Martin Ulrich
Thomas Searle
Gerhard Pusnik
Simon Wheeldon
Christoph Brandner
Herbert Hohenberger
Michael Lampert
Martin Hohenberger
Patrick Pilloni
Gerhard Unterluggauer
Gerald Ressmann
Rick Nasheim
Normand Krumpschmid
Mario Schaden
Christian Perthaler
Dieter Kalt
Head coach: Ron Kennedy

Luge

Men

(Men's) Doubles

Women

Nordic combined 

Men's individual

Events:
 normal hill ski jumping
 15 km cross-country skiing 

Men's Team

Four participants per team.

Events:
 normal hill ski jumping
 5 km cross-country skiing

Ski jumping 

Men's team large hill

 1 Four teams members performed two jumps each.

Snowboarding

Men's giant slalom

Men's halfpipe

Women's giant slalom

Women's halfpipe

Speed skating

Men

Women

References
Official Olympic Reports
International Olympic Committee results database
 Olympic Winter Games 1998, full results by sports-reference.com

Nations at the 1998 Winter Olympics
1998
Winter Olympics